Juan Pablo Orozco Lozano (born 24 October 1991) is a Mexican professional footballer. He used to play for Zacatepec in the Ascenso MX, but is currently a free agent.

Club career
He began his career at Club Deportivo Guadalajara, making his Liga MX debut on 2 September 2011 against Club Tijuana.

References

External links

Footballers from Jalisco
C.D. Guadalajara footballers
Club Atlético Zacatepec players
Coras de Nayarit F.C. footballers
Correcaminos UAT footballers
1991 births
Living people
Association football wingers
People from Arandas, Jalisco
Mexican footballers